

Auxilium ISC School
The school run by Salesian Sisters of Don Bosco is located about 1.5 km from Kottiyam junction, in Kollam District, Kerala, India. The present principal of the School is Sr Jancy augustine . Being a Don Bosco institution, the school promotes cultural activities and sports along with academics. The school gained limelight during academic year 1999-2000 when it emerged winners at the ICSE/ISC State Athletics Meet held at Mavelikkara for the first time in history. The school had an impressive record in the state ICSE/ISC school athletic meets over the years. The students from the school have consecutively represented Kerala in the National ICSE/ISC Athletic meet for the past 12 years. The alumni of the school have made their mark in the various fields. The past pupils association is a major wing of the school, active in all major activities of the school and the management. Representatives of the past pupils association attends the annual planning meeting of the Bengaluru Province (Karnataka, Kerala and Andhra Pradesh) of the Salesian Sisters Institutions. The annual past pupils meet of the school is held on December 26 every year.

References

Salesian secondary schools
Catholic secondary schools in India
Christian schools in Kerala
Schools in Kollam district